Kinito Méndez, born José del Carmen Ramírez Méndez on November 18, 1963, is a Merengue Music singer.

Mendez started his career in Merengue Music in 1988 as one of the Co-founders of the popular Merengue band "La Cocoband", along with Alfonzo "Pochy" Vásquez and Bobby Rafael. Mendez wrote and arranged many of La Cocoband's hit songs including "La Manito" "El Boche" "La Seca" "El Cacu" and "Mujer Malvada". With the success of La Cocoband Mendez decided to leave and start his own project in early 1992 along with Bobby Rafael which was "Rokabanda", who won Orquesta Revelación del Año in Los Premios Cassandra in 1993. With Rokabanda, Mendez continued his success producing hits such as "El Bacano", "Rechenchén", "El Ñoñito" and "los hombres maduro". Mendez recorded three hit albums with Rokabanda. In 1995 Mendez decided to go solo and released his much anticipated solo album "El Hombre Merengue"  which sold 1.5 million copies, a rare feat for a Tropical Artist. Mendez was responsible for the 1997 song "El Vuelo 587", which pays tribute to American Airlines Flight 587, an early morning departure flight from New York City to Santo Domingo, Dominican Republic. Mendez partially wrote the lyrics, and he and Johnny Ventura sung the song, which was one of the songs in "Merenboom, Vol. 2." Méndez himself had been a passenger on the flight before the November 12, 2001 accident flight had occurred. The song was later re-released as "The Plane," or "El Avion" in Spanish. Méndez said that originally the song was intended to be about happiness while traveling to the Dominican Republic for the holidays. The aircraft on the flight crashed in 2001. Papi LaFontaine, who once served as Méndez's manager, died in the 2001 accident flight. Méndez said that he was considering writing a new song about the flight, "[b]ut it would be a slower song in tribute to all those who died."

Discography 

 El Hombre Merengue (1995)
 El Decreto de Kinito Méndez (1997)
 A Caballo... (1998)
 Su Amigo (1999)
 D'Colores (2000)
 A Palo Limpio (2001)
 Sigo Siendo el Hombre Merengue (2002)
 Celebra Conmigo (2004)
 Con Sabor a Mi (2006)
 La Fábrica (2008)

Compilations 

 Los Éxitos de Kinito Méndez (1995)
 Cachamba 96: The Unreleased Versions (1996)
 Sólo Éxitos (1998)
 20th Anniversary (1999)
 12 Éxitos (2001)
 20 Éxitos (2002)
 Éxitos de Kinito Méndez (2005)
 Vida (2009)

Pa' Ti Pa' Mi Records 

 El Hombre Merengue (1996)
 Vale la Pena (1998)

The Record Label for all Kinito Recordings throughout the 90s was J & N RECORDS and never Pa' Ti' Pa' Mi Records.  Any authorized uses of the masters on Kinito's album were MASTER LICENSES and not that this, or any other label, had the rights.

Videography 

 A Caballo... (1999)
 Ayer y Hoy (2005)

Web

References

20th-century Dominican Republic male singers
21st-century Dominican Republic male singers
Merengue musicians
Latin music songwriters
Living people
1963 births